Platylabini is a tribe of ichneumon wasps in the family Ichneumonidae. There are at least 40 genera and about 8 described species in Platylabini.

Genera
These 40 genera belong to the tribe Platylabini:

 Acantholabus Heinrich, 1974
 Afrectopius Heinrich, 1936
 Ambloplisus Heinrich, 1930
 Apaeleticus Wesmael, 1845
 Asthenolabus Heinrich, 1951
 Carlsonia Heinrich, 1973
 Clypeolabus Heinrich, 1974
 Cotiheresiarches Telenga, 1929
 Cratolaboides Tereshkin, 2009
 Cratolabus Heinrich, 1974
 Cyclolabellus Heinrich, 1974
 Cyclolabus Heinrich, 1936
 Dentilabus Heinrich, 1974
 Ectopius Wesmael, 1859
 Ectopoides Heinrich, 1951
 Heinrichiellus Tereshkin, 2009
 Hirtolabus Heinrich, 1974
 Hoploplatystylus Schmiedeknecht, 1912
 Hypomecus Wesmael, 1845
 Lamprojoppa Cameron, 1901
 Levansa Townes, 1961
 Linycus Cameron, 1903
 Lissolaboides Heinrich, 1974
 Neeurylabia Heinrich, 1967
 Neolevansa Gauld, 1984
 Neolinycus Heinrich, 1971
 Notoplatylabus Heinrich, 1936
 Pachyjoppa Cameron, 1901
 Pagarenes Cameron, 1903
 Platybirmania Heinrich, 1974
 Platylabus Wesmael, 1845
 Platymischos Tischbein, 1868
 Poecilostictus Ratzeburg, 1852
 Pristicerops Heinrich, 1961
 Pristiceros Gravenhorst, 1829
 Probolus Wesmael, 1845
 Pyramidophorus Tischbein, 1882
 Rhyssolabus
 Spanophatnus Cameron, 1905
 Tropicolabus Heinrich, 1959

References

Ichneumoninae
Hymenoptera tribes